17-Bit is an independent video game developer. The company was founded as Haunted Temple Studios in 2009 by Jake Kazdal, formerly an artist with Sega, to make games with a 16-bit era aesthetic. The name changed to 17-Bit in May 2012 with a logo designed by Cory Schmitz. Gamasutra described the team, based in both Kyoto and Seattle, as an example of successful indie cross-platform development for its work on Skulls of the Shogun. GungHo Online Entertainment became 17-Bit's house publisher in October 2014 as the developer worked on Galak-Z: The Dimensional.

References

External links

2009 establishments in Washington (state)
Video game companies established in 2009
Indie video game developers
Video game development companies
Video game companies of the United States
Companies based in Seattle
American companies established in 2009